Umapathy Ramaiah is an Indian actor who works in Tamil-language films. He is the son of actor and comedian Thambi Ramaiah.

Career 
Umapathy made his debut in the comedy film Adhagappattathu Magajanangalay (2017). In a review of the film by The Times of India, a critic noted that "For a debutant, Umapathy comes as agile and good at dancing". His next film was his father's directorial venture Maniyaar Kudumbam (2018). Umapathy played a marriage groom in Cheran's Thirumanam (2019). His next film is Devadas, a comedy film, and Thanne Vandi, a romantic comedy.
Then Umapathy participated in Survivor Tamil series which gained him huge popularity among audience and he became a household name. His upcoming directorial debut is the project Thambi Ramaiah.

Personal life 
His father, Thambi Ramaiah, is an actor and director. Umapathy is a trained dancer and choreographer. He has also trained as a MMA fighter.

Filmography

Television

References

External links 

Indian male film actors
Living people
Male actors from Tamil Nadu
Male actors in Tamil cinema
1994 births